Josh Barlow (born 19 January 2004) is an English professional footballer who plays as a midfielder for  club Shrewsbury Town.

Career
Barlow made his professional debut at Shrewsbury Town in May 2022, having previously captained the academy side. He made his senior debut for the club on 30 August 2022, in a 2–1 defeat to Wolverhampton Wanderers U21 at the New Meadow.

Style of play
Barlow is a central midfielder who is comfortable in possession, has a good passing range, and a powerful shot.

Career statistics

References

2004 births
Living people
English footballers
Association football midfielders
Shrewsbury Town F.C. players